Hormops is a genus of true weevils in the beetle family Curculionidae. There are at least two described species in Hormops.

Species
These two species belong to the genus Hormops:
 Hormops abducens LeConte, 1876
 Hormops latipennis Casey, 1924

References

Further reading

 
 
 

Molytinae
Articles created by Qbugbot